The Clos de Villeneuve is a bastide, or Provençal manor house, built in the 18th century, located in the commune of Valensole in the Department of Alpes-de-Haute-Provence in France. Its gardens are classified among the Remarkable Gardens of France by the French Ministry of Culture.

The bastide was built in the first half of the 18th century by Jean-Baptiste de Villeneuve, the seigneur de Villeneuve, an old Provençal family. The gardens were created in the late 20th century by their present owner, the Comte Andre de Villeneuve Esclapon. They are laid out on three terraces with seven basins and fountains dating to the 18th and 19th centuries.

External links
 Home Page of the Clos de Villeneuve

Buildings and structures in Alpes-de-Haute-Provence
Villeneuve, Clos de
Houses in France